Jacqueline Lisa Dark (also Jacqueline Moran) is an Australian operatic mezzo-soprano. She was born in Ballarat and attended the University of Ballarat from 1986 to 1988, receiving a Bachelor of Science (Physics) and a Graduate Diploma of Education in 1989.

Dark trained at the Victorian College of the Arts where she received first class honours in the Graduate Diploma of Opera in 1995.

Performance

Dark has performed with Opera Australia, Victorian State Opera, was young artist for Opera Queensland in 2000, performed at the Vienna State Opera the roles of Giovanna (Rigoletto), Grimgerde (Die Walküre), Annina (La traviata), Mercedes (Carmen), and Il Pastore (shepherd) in Tosca.

Her 2013/2014 Opera Australia schedule included Emilia, Donna Elvira, Filippyevna in Eugene Onegin, Meg Page in Falstaff, Lady Billows in Albert Herring and Fricka in Der Ring des Nibelungen. She has performed the alto solos in Rossini's Stabat Mater for the West Australian Symphony Orchestra. In 2012, Jacqueline Dark sang Herodias in Opera Australia's new production of Salome and won the Green Room Award for Outstanding Principal Female in Opera as Donna Elvira in Don Giovanni.

Her performance experience encompasses opera, music theatre, cabaret, theatre restaurant and the concert platform; it includes the roles of The Composer (Ariadne auf Naxos), Carmen and Mercedes (Carmen), Dorabella (Così fan tutte), the title role and Tisbe in La Cenerentola (for which she won a Green Room Award), Suzuki (Madama Butterfly), Rosmira (Partenope), Donna Elvira (Don Giovanni), Second and Third Lady (Die Zauberflöte), Marcellina (Le nozze di Figaro), Maurya (Riders to the Sea), Mrs Herring (Albert Herring), the title role in Iolanthe, Maddalena (Rigoletto), Emilia (Otello), Lucilla (La scala di seta), Marianna (Il signor Bruschino), Flora (La traviata), Annina (Der Rosenkavalier), Pitti-Sing/Katisha (The Mikado) and Mary (Der fliegende Holländer).

Dark performed the role of Sally Lowe in the world premiere of Lindy and the title role in Iolanthe for Opera Australia, and covered the role of Pearl in the world premiere of Richard Mills' Summer of the Seventeenth Doll. She appeared as a soloist with groups including the Melbourne Chorale, the Australian Opera and Ballet Orchestra (concert series), Orchestra Victoria, the Australian National Academy of Music, the Royal Philharmonic Society and the Queensland Symphony Orchestra.

She joined the Tasmanian Symphony Orchestra along with Trisha Crowe, Michael Falzon, Amanda Harrison and others to record I Dreamed a Dream: Hit Songs from Broadway for ABC Classics in 2013.

Major roles
Major roles performed by Dark include:
Fricka (Der Ring des Nibelungen – Wagner) Opera Australia
 Herodias (Salome – Strauss) Opera Australia
Donna Elvira (Don Giovanni – Mozart) Opera Australia
Katisha (The Mikado – Gilbert and Sullivan) Opera Australia
Marcellina (The Marriage of Figaro – Mozart) Opera Australia
Maddalena (Rigoletto – Verdi) Opera Australia
Annina (Der Rosenkavalier – Strauss) Opera Australia
Rosmira (Partenope – Handel) Opera Australia
Emilia (Otello – Verdi) Opera Australia
Flora (La traviata – Verdi) Opera Australia
Suzuki (Madama Butterfly – Puccini) Opera Australia and Opera Queensland
The Composer (Ariadne auf Naxos – Strauss) Victorian Opera
Dorabella (Così fan tutte – Mozart) Victorian Opera
Carmen (Carmen – Bizet) Eastern Metropolitan Opera

Recordings
For Opera Australia and CinemaLive – DVD and CD recordings:
The Marriage of Figaro (Mozart)
Der Rosenkavalier (Strauss)
The Mikado (Gilbert and Sullivan)
Don Giovanni (Mozart)

For Opera Australia and ABC:
Lindy (Henderson)

For the Tasmanian Symphony Orchestra and ABC Classics (as part of a compilation)
I Dreamed a Dream – Hit Songs From Broadway – "Climb Ev'ry Mountain" from The Sound of Music

Recognition

Among Dark's awards and major prizes are two Green Room Award for her role of Tisbe in Opera Australia's La Cenerentola (2004) and as Donna Elvira in Don Giovanni in 2011, an overseas study grant by the Australian Elizabethan Theatre Trust (2001), the Vienna State Opera Award (2000), 3rd place in the Metropolitan Opera National Council Auditions finals (1999), as well as a finalist in McDonald's Operatic Aria (1999, 2000), Herald Sun Aria (1998, 2000), National Liederfest (2000), Covent Garden National Opera Studio Scholarship (1998). She has won the Ringwood Aria 1997, Geelong Aria (1997), Fletcher Jones Memorial Aria (1994), Shell Aria (1993), Victorian Theatre Guild Award (Performance of Distinction) (1989), Encore Award for Performance of Excellence (1986). Dark won the award for Best Female Performer in a Supporting Role in an Opera at the 2013 Helpmann Awards for her role as Herodias in Opera Australia's Salome. and nominated in the 2014 Helpmann Award Best Female Performer in a Supporting Role in an Opera category for The Melbourne Ring Cycle.

Dark launched the 2007 season at Her Majesty's Theatre in her home town of Ballarat as Dorabella in Così fan tutte.

Notes

External links

Profile, Patrick Togher Artists' Management

20th-century Australian women opera singers
Operatic mezzo-sopranos
Australian mezzo-sopranos
Helpmann Award winners
Living people
Year of birth missing (living people)
Federation University Australia alumni
21st-century Australian women opera singers